The Eastern region is one of four regions in the country of Uganda.

Districts 
, the Eastern Region contained 32 districts:

External links 
 Google Map of the Eastern Region of Uganda

References 

 
Regions of Uganda